Airmyn railway station was on the Selby to Goole Line. It served the village of Airmyn in the East Riding of Yorkshire, England.

History
The station was opened by the North Eastern Railway on 1 May 1912 as Airmyn and Rawcliffe. It became part of the London and North Eastern Railway under the Grouping of 1923. The station then passed on to the Eastern Region of British Railways on nationalisation in 1948. It was renamed on 12 June 1961 to Airmyn.

The single storey station and platforms were built entirely of wood. Two sidings led off the through line behind the main station building.

The line and station were built with double tracks and platforms, but most of the route, including Airmyn and Rawcliffe, was reduced to single track around 1923. The passenger service was withdrawn by the British Railways Board on 15 June 1964, the goods service followed on 7th December of that year. The tracks and associated infrastructure were subsequently lifted.

The site today
There is a large building on the platform which still exists.

References

Sources

 
 
 
 
 
 
 
 The Goole and Selby Railway

Service

External links
 The station on a navigable O.S. map npe Maps
 The station on other OS maps National Library of Scotland
 The line and its stations Rail Map Online
 The line with mileages Railway Codes
 The station and Goole from the air in 1949 Britain from Above (free login needed to zoom)

Disused railway stations in the East Riding of Yorkshire
Former North Eastern Railway (UK) stations
Railway stations in Great Britain opened in 1912
Railway stations in Great Britain closed in 1964
Beeching closures in England
1912 establishments in England